The Dobruja Plateau or Dobrogea Plateau  is a plateau in eastern Romania located in the Dobruja region, surrounded to the north and west by the Danube and to the east by the Danube Delta and the Black Sea.

Its average altitude is around 200–300 metres, higher in the northern part. The highest point is the Țuțuiatu/Greci Peak in the Măcin Mountains, at a height of 467 m.

The climate is slightly warmer and more arid than in the rest of Romania and as such, its flora contains some Mediterranean species.

The Casimcea River and Taița River flow through it from west to east. There are several lakes, including some lagoons, the most important being Oltina Lake, Bugeac Lake, Mangalia Lake, Techirghiol Lake, Siutghiol Lake, Lake Tașaul, and Razim Lake.

Subdivisions
Its main subdivisions are:
Măcin Mountains
Casimcea Plateau
Tulcea Hills
Medgidia Plateau
Negru Vodă Plateau
Oltina Plateau
Istria Plateau

References 

Dobruja
Plateaus of Romania